The Medical Corps of the United States Navy is a staff corps consisting of military physicians in a variety of specialties. It is the senior corps among all staff corps, second in precedence only to line officers. The corps of commissioned officers was founded on March 3, 1871.

Prior to the formal establishment of the corps, ships’ surgeons served without commissions, unless given one by the commanding officer. Those commissions would be for the duration of a specific cruise.

The Medical Corps is one of the four staff corps of the Navy's Bureau of Medicine and Surgery (BUMED), which is led by the Surgeon General of the United States Navy.

Facing a shortage of trained physicians to serve the needs of the Navy and Marine Corps, the Uniformed Services Health Professions Revitalization Act of 1972 was passed. This was a two-pronged act in which the Uniformed Services University of the Health Sciences and the Health Professions Scholarship Program were created. In both programs, civilians are given a direct commission to the rank of ensign (O-1) in the United States Navy Reserve which they hold throughout the four years of their medical education. During this time they receive financial assistance on the condition that they meet reservist requirements, maintain military standards, and agree to serve on active duty as physicians. The commitment required is at least 4 years for HPSP and 7 years of service for USUHS students.  

Upon graduation, the new physicians are promoted to the rank of lieutenant (O-3) and enter active duty as medical interns (PGY-1) at a Naval Hospital.

Upon completion of an internship year, a Navy physician can be deployed to the fleet as a General Medical Officer, though opportunities also exist to complete full-residency training in the specialty of their choice or undergo 6 months of training to become a Flight Surgeon or Undersea Medical Officer
.

RADM Bruce L. Gillingham is the 39th Surgeon General of the United States Navy  and is the highest-ranking officer of the Medical Corps.  The Chief of the Medical Corps is RDML Guido F. Valdes, who concurrently serves as Commander, Naval Medical Forces Pacific.

Qualifications and designations

Members of the Medical Corps are eligible to pursue qualification programs that lead to breast insignia such as:
 Flight Surgeon Insignia (USA, USN, USAF)
 Astronaut Badge
 Surface Warfare Medical Corps Insignia
 Submarine Medical Insignia
 Diving (Medical) Insignia
 Fleet Marine Force Insignia
 Master Parachutist Badge
 Seabee combat warfare specialist insignia

Ships named after physicians
Reference: Dictionary of American Naval Fighting Ships

 USS Begor (DE-711)
 USS J. Douglas Blackwood (DE-219)
 USS Boone (FFG-28)
 USS Bronstein (DE-189)
 USS Bronstein (DE-1037)
 USS Gendreau (DE-639)
 USS Grayson (DD-435)
 USS Heermann (DD-532)
 USS Kane (DD-235)
 USS Kane (AGS-27)
 USS Longshaw (DD-559)
 USS Samuel S. Miles (DE-183)
 USS Pinkney (APH-2)
 USS Pratt (DE-363)
 USS Rall (DE-304)
 USS Ringness (DE-590)
 USS Rixey (APH-3)
 USS Tryon (APH-1)
 USS William M. Wood (DD-715)
 USS Wood (DD-317)
 USNS Charles Drew (T-AKE-10)

See also
 United States Army Medical Corps

References

External links
National Naval Medical Center Bethesda official webpage (on USN official website). Retrieved 2009-12-05.
Naval Medical Center Portsmouth official webpage (on USN official website). Retrieved 2009-12-05.
Naval Medical Center San Diego official webpage (on USN official website). Retrieved 2009-12-05.
Medical Corps. Navy.com (Health Care Opportunities). Retrieved 2009-12-05.
Virtual Naval Hospital   - a digital library of military medicine and humanitarian medicine. Retrieved 2010-09-22.
Per NAVEDTRA 12966 Commander Naval Medical Education and Training Command. Retrieved 2011-01-08.

United States Navy Medical Corps
Medical units and formations of the United States Navy